Alwero River (also spelt Aloru, Aluoro and Alwero) is a river in Abobo woreda of Gambela Region, Ethiopia.  It flows through the Gambela National Park and through wetlands into the Openo/Baro River.
The potential land for irrigation development in the Gambella region, where the present study was conducted, is estimated to be 500,000 ha [10]. The region has a number of perennial rivers including, Baro, Alwero, Gillo, and Akobo, which can be used as a potential source of irrigation water. 
In fact, this study was initiated and carried out to assess the physical land suitability for irrigation in the lower Alwero river area of Abobo, Anywaa Zone of Gambella Region.

See also 
 List of rivers of Ethiopia

 

Rivers of Ethiopia
Gambela Region
Sobat River